Fuel price risk management, a specialization of both financial risk management and oil price analysis and similar to conventional risk management practice, is a continual cyclic process that includes risk assessment, risk decision making and the implementation of risk controls. It focuses primarily on when and how an organization can best hedge against exposure to fuel price volatility. It is generally referred to as "bunker hedging" in marine and shipping contexts and "fuel hedging" in aviation and trucking contexts.

Providers of fuel price risk management services
Fuel price risk management services are predominantly provided by specialist teams within fuel management companies, oil companies, financial institutions, utilities and trading companies. Examples include:

Fuel management companies – Mercatus Energy Advisors, INTL FCStone, World Fuel Services, Onyx Capital Advisory, Global Risk Management
Oil companies – Total S.A., Royal Dutch Shell, ExxonMobil, Koch Industries, BP
Financial institutions – BNP Paribas, Goldman Sachs, JP Morgan, Barclays plc, Macquarie Bank, Citigroup, Morgan Stanley, Wells Fargo
Utilities – RWE Supply and Trading GmbH, EdF
Independent trading companies – DRW, Optiver

The fuel price risk management process
Similar to conventional risk management practice, fuel price risk management is considered a continual cyclic process that includes the following:

1 Establishing the context
current and future business environment
financial position and budgets
objectives and needs
required fuel consumption, etc.
2 Risk assessment
fuel cost calculations
risk identification
the organization's attitude to risk
exposure analysis to fuel price fluctuations
scenarios of various hedging strategies
3 Risk treatment
implementation of a fuel price risk strategy
4 Monitor and review

An alternative to the above described process is the following:
1 Identify, analyze and quantify the fuel related risks
2 Determine tolerance for risk and develop a fuel price risk management policy
3 Develop fuel price risk management implementation strategies
4 Establish controls and procedures
5 Initial implementation of fuel price risk management strategies
6 Monitor, analyze and reporting
7 Repeat the process on as needed basis

Real investments as risk reduction 

Energy efficiency measures can be seen as real capital investments that, in addition to reducing fuel costs, reduce exposure fuel price risk. As less fuel is consumed, a smaller cost component is susceptible to fluctuations in fuel prices. The value of this risk reduction can be calculated using the Tuominen-Seppänen method and its value has been shown to be approximately 10 % compared to direct cost savings for a typical energy efficient building.

See also 
 Commodity markets
 Commodity risk
 Energy derivative
 Liquidity risk
 Market risk
 Risk modeling

Notes

References
 

Market risk
Transport economics